Lee Savident (born 22 October 1976 in Saint Martin, Guernsey) is a Guernsey cricketer who currently plays for Guernsey in international cricket. He is a right-handed batsman who bowls right-arm medium pace. He currently resides in Southampton, Hampshire.

County career
Savident made his first-class debut for Hampshire in the 1997 County Championship against Yorkshire. He played two further first-class matches that season against Kent and Nottinghamshire. He would have to wait two more years before playing another first-class match for Hampshire, between then he played for the Second XI, who he first represented in 1994. In that same season he made his debut in List A cricket against Middlesex. Savident was an irregular feature in the Hampshire one-day side the following season.

In the 1999 season he played a single first-class match in against the touring Zimbabweans, which was his final first-class match. Having not played List A cricket in 1999, he appeared three further times for Hampshire in the 2000 season, making his final appearance for the county against Nottinghamshire. Many of his lack of first team opportunities were down to injury which had plagued him since his debut season. At the end of the 2000 season he announced his retirement from competitive cricket. In his four seasons with Hampshire, he played 4 first-class matches. In these he scored 32 runs at a batting average of 8.00, with a high score of 10*. With the ball he took 4 wickets at a bowling average of 71.50, with best figures 2/86. In 8 List A matches he scored 94 runs at an average of 18.80, with a high score of 39. With the ball he took 6 wickets at an average of 20.66, with best figures of 3/41.

Three years later he turned out in a List A match for Dorset in the 1st round of the 2004 Cheltenham & Gloucester Trophy against Buckinghamshire which was played in 2003. With the ball he claimed a single wicket in the match, that of future New Zealand international James Marshall. Savident played just the one match for Dorset and did not represent them in Minor counties cricket.

International career
Despite being born on Guernsey, he did not represent the island of his birth until 2005 when Guernsey played the Scotland Academy during their tour of Scotland. The following year he represented Guernsey in the 2006 European Cricket Championship Division Two and in 2008 he played in the same competition.
The following year he played in World Cricket League Division Seven, where he played in all of Guernsey's matches. Guernsey earned promotion to 2009 ICC World Cricket League Division Seven in Singapore. He made his highest score in the competition in Guernsey's final match against Botswana, scoring 65. Guernsey earned promotion to 2011 Division Six, which Savident also played in, and which saw Guernsey promoted to 2012 Division Five. He wasn't selected for that tournament as he had undergone a back operation in the weeks leading up to the competition.

References

External links
Lee Savident at ESPNcricinfo
Lee Savident at CricketArchive

1976 births
Living people
Guernsey cricketers
Hampshire cricketers
Dorset cricketers
Hampshire Cricket Board cricketers